Phobia is a 1988 Australian film written and directed by John Dingwall.

Production
Dingwall wanted to make the film for as low a budget as possible so wrote it around two characters and one location. He wrote the script in a week.

Paul Thompson was meant to star opposite Gosia Dobrowolska but he dropped out of the project at the least moment and was replaced by Sean Scully.  Dingwall mortgaged his house to pay for the budget himself. The film was shot over three weeks in February and March 1988 with a week of rehearsal using a young crew.

Release
The film struggled to obtain a release.

It was released via SBS and all the crew were paid their deferments.

It was nominated for Sean Scully as Best Actor at the AFI awards in 1988.

References

External links

Phobia at Oz Movies

Australian drama films
1988 films
1980s English-language films
1980s Australian films